Francis Melhuish (17 May 1857 – unknown) was an English cricketer active in 1877 who played for Lancashire. He was born in Birkenhead. He appeared in three first-class matches as a righthanded batsman, scoring 32 runs with a highest score of 13 and held no catches.

Notes

1857 births
Date of death unknown
English cricketers
Lancashire cricketers